James McMichael may refer to:

 James L. McMichael (born 1939), American poet
 James M. McMichael (1870–1944), American architect